The teams competing in Group 1 of the 2013 UEFA European Under-21 Championship qualifying competition were Belarus, Bosnia and Herzegovina, Cyprus, Germany, Greece and San Marino.

Standings

Results and fixtures

Goalscorers
8 goals
 Peniel Mlapa

6 goals

 Nemanja Bilbija
 Milan Đurić

5 goals

 Miroslav Stevanović
 Alexander Esswein

4 goals

 Dmitri Khlebosolov
 Nestoras Mitidis
 Maximilian Beister
 Lewis Holtby

3 goals

 Aleh Patotski
 Edin Višća
 Marcos Michael
 Pierre-Michel Lasogga
 Moritz Leitner
 Sebastian Polter
 Giannis Potouridis

2 goals

 Muhamed Bešić
 Daniel Ginczek
 Kostas Fortounis
 Charalampos Mavrias
 Athanasios Petsos
 Apostolos Vellios
 Manuel Battistini

1 goal

 Alyaksandr Anyukevich
 Alyaksandr Kuhan
 Ihar Kuzmyanok
 Srđan Grahovac
 Goran Zakarić
 Andreas Alkiviadou
 Stelios Demetriou
 Charalambos Dimosthenous
 Nikos Englezou
 Nicolas Killas
 Andreas Pittaras
 Valentinos Sielis
 Stefan Bell 
 Daniel Didavi
 Julian Draxler
 Patrick Funk
 İlkay Gündoğan
 Jan Kirchhoff
 Sebastian Neumann
 Panagiotis Vlachodimos

1 own goal
 Vadim Kurlovich (playing against Cyprus)
 Andrey Lebedzew (playing against Greece)
 Slavko Brekalo (playing against Cyprus)
 Marios Antoniades (playing against Bosnia and Herzegovina)
 Andreas Christofides (playing against Belarus)
 Giorgos Economides (playing against Greece)

References

External links
Standings and fixtures at UEFA.com

Group 1